Sahar Ajdamsani (Persian:سحر اژدم ثانی) (born 26 March 1996) is an Iranian singer, songwriter, poet, lyricist, writer and photographer.

Biography
Sahar started writing poetry at the age of eight, and has written  poetry in Persian, English and German.‍

The theme of her works are world peace, the defense of women's rights, kindness, and humanity.  She is known as an artist who defends women's rights and human rights with her arts and promotes peace, humanity, equality & kindness.

She is one of the few Iranian artists that many countries have written about her arts and is the first Iranian who is the winner of WILD sound poetry festival for her poem "Censorship" that focuses on women rights.

Sahar also selected as the representative of Global Photographic Union in Iran.

Although music in Iran is forbidden and prohibited for women, she has had many concerts in many countries and despite the many limitations for women in Iran, she has succeeded and is internationally recognized.

Her poems have been translated into many different languages and published in many countries. She has also been invited to poetry festivals in many countries.

Awards
WILDsound poetry festival, New York, US, 2019 
Black & White photography festival, Athens, Greece, 2019
Best poet of 8th International Athens poetry festival, Athens, Greece, 2019 
10th Woman Scream international poetry festival, Mexico, 2020

Books
5th season of the earth, a 2018 (poetry book)
I flew to the moon, a 2019 (poetry book)

Albums
 Dreamy World: A world peace music album. The melody of every poem in this album composed by a composer of a country with 13 countries collaborating in this album.  The purpose of this UN and UNICEF supported album was to demonstrate the world seeking peace.

Unique Art works
 Quarantine World: A song and music video about covid-19 pandemic in 11 different languages (Persian, English, German, Kurdish, French, Arabic, Italian, Spanish, Russian, Hindi and Greek) featured 11 world stars (Jessica Lynn, Bernd Kieckhäben, Karwan Kamil, Flora Fishbach, Ammar Alazaki, Erica De Matteis, Luis Fernando Borjas, Rodion Gazmanov, Jyotica Tangri, Nasos Papargyropoulos). Sahar wrote the lyrics (all languages) & melody herself. She wrote the lyrics in 1 day & mentioned it as a miracle. She is also producer, director and screen writer of this global project.

Exhibitions
Athens, Greece, 2019
Milan, Italy, 2020

References

External links

Iranian women poets
Iranian women photographers
21st-century Iranian women singers
1996 births
Living people